British American Tobacco Bangladesh is one of the largest multinational corporations, operated by British American Tobacco in Bangladesh. They are listed on the stock index of the Dhaka Stock Exchange and Chittagong Stock Exchange. It is doing its business over 100 years in this region. It was founded in Bangladesh in 1910. It had established its first depot at Armanitola in Dhaka. After partition in 1947, it was established in 1949. After the independence of Bangladesh from Pakistan, it was renamed as Bangladesh Tobacco Company (BTC) in 1972. But in 1998, it is again renamed as British American Tobacco Bangladesh (BATB). In Bangladesh, British American Tobacco Bangladesh has more than 1,200 people as direct employees and more than 50,000 people as indirect employees (mostly farmers).

British American Tobacco Bangladesh's motto is "success and responsibility go together". Shehzad Munim is the current managing director of BATB. He is serving as the first ever Bangladeshi MD in the history of BATB.

Brands
Benson & Hedges
John Player Gold Leaf
Lucky Strike
Capstan
Star
Royals
Derby
Pilot
Hollywood

References

Bangladeshi subsidiaries of foreign companies
Tobacco companies of Bangladesh
British American Tobacco